In anatomy and osteology, a  foramen (plural foramina,  or foramens ) is an open hole that is present in extant or extinct amniotes. Foramina inside the body of animals typically allow nerves, arteries, veins, or other structures to connect one part of the body with another.

Skull

The skulls of vertebrates have foramina through which nerves, arteries, veins, and other structures pass. For example, a human skull has parietal foramina.

Spine

Within the vertebral column (spine) of vertebrates, including the human spine, each bone has an opening at both its top and bottom to allow nerves, arteries, veins, etc. to pass through.

Other
 Apical foramen, the hole at the tip of the root of a tooth
 Foramen ovale (heart), a hole between the venous and arterial sides of the fetal heart
 Transverse foramen, one of a pair of openings in each cervical vertebra, in which the vertebral artery travels
 Greater sciatic foramen, a major foramen of the pelvis
 Interventricular foramina, channels connecting ventricles in the brain
 Lesser sciatic foramen, an opening between the pelvis and the posterior thigh
 Obturator foramen, the hole created by the ischium and pubis bones of the pelvis
 Omental foramen, the connecting opening between the greater sac and the lesser sac in the abdominal cavity.
 Sacral foramina, which perforate the vertebral canal from the Sacrum (sacral bone), and through which the sacral nerves pass.
 Vertebral foramen, the foramen formed by the anterior segment (the body), and the posterior part, the vertebral arch.
 Foramen of Panizza, a hole connecting two aortas just after they leave the heart in crocodiles.

See also
Eta Carinae
Fossa (disambiguation)
Skeleton
Foraminifera

References

Animal anatomy